The 1916 All-Ireland Senior Hurling Championship Final was the 29th All-Ireland Final and the culmination of the 1916 All-Ireland Senior Hurling Championship, an inter-county hurling tournament for the top teams in Ireland. The match was held at Croke Park, Dublin, on 21 January 1917 between Kilkenny, represented by club side Tullaroan, and Tipperary, represented by club side Boherlahan. The Leinster champions lost to their Munster opponents on a score line of 5-4 to 3-2.

Match details

References

1
All-Ireland Senior Hurling Championship Finals
Kilkenny GAA matches
Tipperary GAA matches
All-Ireland Senior Hurling Championship
All-Ireland Senior Hurling Championship Final, 1917